Renfrew Football Club was a Scottish football team located in the town of Renfrew.

History

The club was founded in 1875, with 30 members in its first season.  The club's first recorded match was a 1–0 home win against Arthurlie F.C. in February 1876.

Renfrew entered the Scottish Cup every season from 1876–77 to 1889–90.  The club's second entry, in 1877–78, saw it reach the fifth round, albeit in unusual circumstances.  The club won its first round tie at Pollokshaws F.C. by default, the home side walking off the pitch while 2–0 down in protest at a refereeing decision.  In the second round the club won 4–0 at Glenkilloch F.C. of Neilston, but was seemingly knocked out in the third by Barrhead F.C., which then beat Partick in the fourth round.  However Barrhead was disqualified from the competition and both Renfrew and Partick were placed in the fifth round, which that season consisted of the final 12 clubs.  Renfrew's run came to an end with a 2–0 loss to Mauchline.

The club was soon overtaken by other clubs in the district.  The Renfrewshire Cup started in 1879–80 but the club did not enter until 1881–82; it lost 3–0 to Arthurlie in the semi-finals.  The club entered the competition for the next 8 seasons but never reached so far again.

By 1889, the club was in financial difficulties and depending on Abercorn F.C. from Paisley - a much larger town than Renfrew - agreeing to play a friendly free of charge in order to replenish funds.  The club entered both the Scottish Cup and the Renfrewshire Cup for 1889–90, but withdrew from both competitions without playing a match.

Colours

The club wore navy shirts until 1888, with white shorts until 1885 and navy shorts thereafter.  For the club's final seasons it wore all white.

Ground

The club played at Glebe Park, on the Paisley Road.   There was an incident of hooliganism at the ground at the start of the 1887–88 season, when one Wm. Hughes of Glasgow refused to pay the admission fee for a friendly with Dykebar F.C., and threatened to knife anyone who tried to charge him; he was fined £1.

Notable players

Jimmy Douglas, played for Renfrew from 1879 to 1880, and later won the FA Cup with Blackburn Rovers

References

External links
Scottish Cup results
Renfrewshire Cup results

Defunct football clubs in Scotland
Football in Renfrewshire
Association football clubs established in 1875
Association football clubs disestablished in 1890
1875 establishments in Scotland
1890 disestablishments in Scotland